Ejaz Ahmed Chowdhury (1 January 1945 – 29 September 2022) is a retired Major General of Bangladesh Army and a heroic freedom fighter of the Liberation War. He served as the Director General of Bangladesh Rifles from 12 February 1995 to 18 July 1996.

Career 
Ejaz Ahmed Chowdhury was a freedom fighter in 1971 in the 2nd East Bengal Regiment. He was serving in the Second East Bengal Regiment as a captain when the Bangladesh Liberation war started. He served as the Commander of Bogra Division. He served as the Director General of Bangladesh Rifles from 12 February 1995 to 18 July 1996.

Allegations of army mutiny 
He was sent to compulsory retirement on 25 May 1996 on charges of failed military coup.

Personal life 
Chowdhury's brother was Brigadier General Waji Ahmed Chowdhury. He was also the son of the Islamic scholar, Maulana Muhammad Ahmad Choudhury - the grandson of the Sufi poet Shah Abdul Wahab Choudhury - as well as being the maternal nephew of another religious scholar of the area Abdul Matin Chowdhury.

References 

Living people
Director Generals of Border Guards Bangladesh
Bangladesh Army generals
Bangladeshi military personnel
People of the Bangladesh Liberation War
People from Golapganj Upazila
1945 births